Bracchi is an Italian surname. Notable people with the surname include:

Alfredo Bracchi (1897–1976), Italian author
Paolo Bracchi (died 1497), Italian Roman Catholic bishop

See also
Bacchi

Italian-language surnames